KRHT-LD (channel 41) is a low-powered television station in Redding, California, United States, it was affiliated with Spanish-language Azteca América network till New Years 2022-23. It was originally broadcasting on channel 58 until March 24, 2009. It is owned by Gary Hanson.

KRHT-LD is rebroadcast on Charter Cable on channel 276 in the Redding area and Comcast Cable in Chico on channel 390 & 621.

Subchannels
The station's digital signal is multiplexed:

References

External links

RHT-LD
2007 establishments in California
Low-power television stations in the United States
Television channels and stations established in 2007